The Bride with White Hair is a 2012 Chinese television series loosely based on Liang Yusheng's novel Baifa Monü Zhuan. Except for some characters' names, the plot is almost completely unrelated to the novel. It was first aired on Hunan Satellite TV on 14 September 2012. Shooting started on 26 April 2012 in Hengdian World Studios, Zhejiang. The series starred Nicky Wu, Ma Su, Louis Fan, Liu Sitong, Li Jie, Guo Zhenni and Ye Zuxin.

Cast
 Nicky Wu as Zhuo Yihang
 Ma Su as Lian Nishang
 Louis Fan as Yue Mingke
 Guo Zhenni as He E'hua
 Li Jie as Geng Shaonan
 Ye Zuxin as Xin Longzi
 Liu Sitong as Tie Shanhu
 Ben Ng as Murong Chong
 Yue Yueli as Tie Feilong / Tie Feihu
 Zhang Tianqi as Wang Zhaoxi
 Zhuo Fan as Jin Duyi
 Lily Tien as Honghua Guimu
 Wei Lai as Bai Min
 Wang Yi as Meng Qiuxia
 Guo Ketong as Tang Jiabi
 Fei Weini as Mo Jiao
 Hou Yu as Gongsun Lei
 Wang Xiuqiang as Taoist Ziyang
 Su Mao as Taoist Baishi
 Zhang Yeshi as Taoist Huangye
 Sun Andong as Shi Hao
 Lin Xiaofeng as Mu Jiuniang
 Zhu Rongrong as Ying Xiuyang
 Ren Xuehai as Wang Jiayin
 Xing Qiqi as Prince Rui
 Yu Zikuan as Tianyang (the mute)
 Du Yuming as Jin Qianyan
 Michelle Yim as Ling Muhua
 Ji Xue as young Ling Muhua
 Dai Jiaoqian as Huo Caidie
 Huo Zhengyan as Huo Tiandu

References

External links
  The Bride with White Hair on Sina.com

2012 Chinese television series debuts
Chinese wuxia television series
Works based on Baifa Monü Zhuan
Television series set in the Ming dynasty
Hunan Television dramas
Television shows based on works by Liang Yusheng
Television series set in the 17th century